The Saint-Étienne River is a tributary of the south shore of the Saguenay River flowing into the municipality of Petit-Saguenay in the Saguenay Fjord, Quebec, Canada. In the end, this river crosses the Saguenay Fjord National Park.

The Saint-Étienne River Valley is mainly served by Chemin Saint-Étienne and Chemin du Lac Fidelin.

Forestry is the first economic activity in the sector; recreational tourism activities, second.

The surface of the Saint-Étienne River is usually frozen from the beginning of December to the end of March, however, safe ice circulation is generally from mid-December to mid-March.

Geography 
The main hydrographic slopes near the Saint-Étienne River are:
 North side: Saguenay River;
 East side: Petites Îles River, St. Lawrence River;
 South side: Petit Saguenay River;
 West side: Petit Saguenay River, Cabanage River.

The Saint-Étienne River rises at the mouth of Lac des Côtes. This source is located at:
 south of its mouth (confluence with the Saguenay River);
 northeast of a curve of the Petit Saguenay River;
 west of the mouth of the Saguenay River;
 south-east of the village center of Petit-Saguenay.

From its source (Lac des Côtes), the course of the Saint-Étienne River descends on  according to the following segments:
 northerly in a confined valley to the outlet (from the southeast) of an unidentified lake;
 northerly in a concealed valley to the outlet (coming from the west) of Lac Fidelin;
 blaster in a valley through Saguenay Fjord National Park to its mouth.

The mouth of the Saint-Étienne River flows into the bottom of Anse Saint-Étienne on the south shore of the Saguenay River. This confluence is located at:

  north-east of the village center of Saint-Étienne;
 } east of the confluence of the Petit Saguenay River with the Saguenay River;
  west of Tadoussac.

Toponymy
The toponym "Saint-Étienne River" refers to St. Stephen (French: Saint-Étienne), a patron of the Roman Catholic Church.

The toponym "Saint-Étienne River" was formalized on December 5, 1968, at the Bank of Place Names of the Commission de toponymie du Québec.

Notes and references

External links

See also 
 Petit-Saguenay, a municipality
 Saguenay Fjord National Park
 Saguenay River, a watercourse
 List of rivers of Quebec

Rivers of Saguenay–Lac-Saint-Jean
Le Fjord-du-Saguenay Regional County Municipality